The 2021–22 season was Real Madrid's 91st in existence, their 66th consecutive season in the top flight of Spanish basketball and 15th consecutive season in the EuroLeague. It was also the 11th (and last) season in a row under the reins of head coach Pablo Laso.

Times up to 31 October 2021 and from 27 March 2022 were CEST (UTC+2). Times from 31 October 2021 to 27 March 2022 were CET (UTC+1).

Overview

Pre-season
On 18 June, head coach Pablo Laso extended his contract until the end of the 2022–2023 season. Six days later, captain Felipe Reyes announced his retirement after 17 seasons in Madrid. On 6 July, Real Madrid announced Thomas Heurtel as the first signing of the season. Six days later, power forward Guerschon Yabusele signed a one-year contract with the club. On 13 July, Nigel Williams-Goss signed for 2 years. On 23 July, Ádám Hanga was announced as a new signing of the club for the next 2 years.

Players

Squad information

}

Depth chart

Transactions

In

|}

Out

|}

Pre-season and friendlies

Friendly matches

Competitions

Overview

Liga ACB

League table

Results summary

Results by round

Matches

ACB Playoffs

Quarterfinals

Semifinals

Finals

EuroLeague

League table

Results summary

Results by round

Matches

EuroLeague Playoffs

Quarterfinals

EuroLeague Final Four

Copa del Rey

Supercopa de España

Statistics

Liga ACB

Source: ACB

EuroLeague

Source: EuroLeague

Copa del Rey

Source: ACB

References

External links
 

 
Real Madrid
Real Madrid